Terje Rypdal/Miroslav Vitous/Jack DeJohnette is an album by guitarist Terje Rypdal, bassist Miroslav Vitous and drummer Jack DeJohnette recorded in 1978 and released on the ECM label.

Reception
The Allmusic review by Paul Collins awarded the album 4½ stars stating "An otherworldly soundscape of aching beauty, this album is a must-have for aficionados of any member of this trio".

Track listing
All compositions by Terje Rypdal except as indicated
 "Sunrise" - 8:30 
 "Den Forste Sne" - 6:39 
 "Will" (Miroslav Vitous) - 8:05 
 "Believer" (Vitous) - 6:27 
 "Flight" (Vitous, Rypdal, Jack DeJohnette) - 5:29 
 "Seasons" (Rypdal, Vitous, DeJohnette) - 7:22
Recorded at Talent Studio in Oslo, Norway in June 1978

Personnel
Terje Rypdal — guitar, guitar synthesizer, organ 
Miroslav Vitous — double bass, electric piano
Jack DeJohnette — drums

References

ECM Records albums
Terje Rypdal albums
Miroslav Vitouš albums
Jack DeJohnette albums
1978 albums
Albums produced by Manfred Eicher